Ummidia is a genus of mygalomorph spiders in the family Halonoproctidae, and was first described by Tamerlan Thorell in 1875.

Species
 it contained fifty-six species.

Ummidia aedificatoria (Westwood, 1840) – Morocco
Ummidia algarve Decae, 2010 – Portugal
Ummidia algeriana (Lucas, 1846) – Algeria, Tunisia
Ummidia anaya Godwin & Bond, 2021 – Mexico
Ummidia armata (Ausserer, 1875) – Unknown
Ummidia asperula (Simon, 1889) – Venezuela
Ummidia audouini (Lucas, 1835) – USA
Ummidia beatula (Gertsch & Mulaik, 1940) – USA
Ummidia brandicarlileae Godwin & Bond, 2021 – Mexico
Ummidia carabivora (Atkinson, 1886) – USA
Ummidia carlosviquezi Godwin & Bond, 2021 – Nicaragua, Costa Rica
Ummidia cerrohoya Godwin & Bond, 2021 – Panama
Ummidia colemanae Godwin & Bond, 2021 – USA
Ummidia cuicatec Godwin & Bond, 2021 – Mexico
Ummidia erema (Chamberlin, 1925) – Panama
Ummidia ferghanensis (Kroneberg, 1875) – Central Asia
Ummidia frankellerae Godwin & Bond, 2021 – Belize
Ummidia funerea (Gertsch, 1936) – USA
Ummidia gabrieli Godwin & Bond, 2021 – Mexico
Ummidia gandjinoi (Andreeva, 1968) – Tajikistan
Ummidia gertschi Godwin & Bond, 2021 – USA
Ummidia gingoteague Godwin & Bond, 2021 – USA
Ummidia glabra (Doleschall, 1871) – Brazil
Ummidia hondurena Godwin & Bond, 2021 – Honduras, El Salvador
Ummidia huascazaloya Godwin & Bond, 2021 – Mexico
Ummidia insularis Santos, Ortiz & Sánchez-Ruiz, 2022 – Dominican Republic
Ummidia macarthuri Godwin & Bond, 2021 – USA
Ummidia matagalpa Godwin & Bond, 2021 – Nicaragua
Ummidia mercedesburnsae Godwin & Bond, 2021 – USA
Ummidia mischi Zonstein, 2014 – Afghanistan
Ummidia modesta (Banks, 1901) – USA
Ummidia neblina Godwin & Bond, 2021 – Venezuela
Ummidia neilgaimani Godwin & Bond, 2021 – USA
Ummidia nidulans (Fabricius, 1787) – Jamaica, West Indies
Ummidia okefenokee Godwin & Bond, 2021 – USA
Ummidia paulacushingae Godwin & Bond, 2021 – USA
Ummidia pesiou Godwin & Bond, 2021 – Mexico
Ummidia picea Thorell, 1875 (type) – Spain
Ummidia pustulosa (Becker, 1879) – Mexico
Ummidia quepoa Godwin & Bond, 2021 – Costa Rica
Ummidia quijichacaca Godwin & Bond, 2021 – Colombia
Ummidia richmond Godwin & Bond, 2021 – USA
Ummidia riverai Godwin & Bond, 2021 – Guatemala
Ummidia rodeo Godwin & Bond, 2021 – Mexico
Ummidia rongodwini Godwin & Bond, 2021 – USA
Ummidia rosillos Godwin & Bond, 2021 – USA
Ummidia rugosa (Karsch, 1880) – Nicaragua, Costa Rica
Ummidia salebrosa (Simon, 1892) – St. Vincent
Ummidia tibacuy Godwin & Bond, 2021 – Colombia
Ummidia timcotai Godwin & Bond, 2021 – USA
Ummidia tunapuna Godwin & Bond, 2021 – Trinidad and Tobago
Ummidia varablanca Godwin & Bond, 2021 – Costa Rica
Ummidia waunekaae Godwin & Bond, 2021 – USA
Ummidia zebrina (F. O. Pickard-Cambridge, 1897) – Mexico, Guatemala
Ummidia zilchi Kraus, 1955 – Mexico, El Salvador, Belize

References

Halonoproctidae
Mygalomorphae genera
Spiders of Asia
Spiders of North America
Spiders of South America
Taxa named by Tamerlan Thorell